Badranlu Rural District is a rural district (dehestan) in the Central District of Bojnord County, North Khorasan Province, Iran. At the 2006 census, its population was 20,278, in 5,073 families.  The rural district has 42 villages.

References 

Rural Districts of North Khorasan Province
Bojnord County